Andrei Germanovich Karev (born February 12, 1985) is a Belarusian professional ice hockey defenceman. He currently plays for Yunost Minsk of the VHL.

Playing career
Karev began his career, playing for Elemash Elktrostal, his home-town team, playing 42 games in the Russian second division. He then moved to the Yunost Minsk system, where has played almost all of his career since. He has won three Belarusian Extraleague titles with Yunost, coming in consecutive years starting in 2008-09.

Karev played six games for Kontinental Hockey League team Dinamo Minsk in 2009-10, returning to Yunost Minsk after that.

International career
Karev was selected for the Belarus national men's ice hockey team in the 2010 Winter Olympics, playing in four games. He had previously played for the Belarus U-20 national team, competing in the 2005 World Junior Ice Hockey Championships

Career statistics

Regular season and playoffs

International

References

External links

1985 births
Living people
Belarusian ice hockey defencemen
HC Dinamo Minsk players
Ice hockey players at the 2010 Winter Olympics
HK Lida players
Olympic ice hockey players of Belarus
People from Elektrostal
Yunost Minsk players